Jakub Kryštof Rad, traditionally Anglicised Jacob Christoph Rad (25 March 1799, in Rheinfelden – 13 October 1871, in Vienna), was a Swiss-born physician and industrial manager. He had many other professional activities, was a director of a sugar factory in Datschitz, Bohemia, Austria-Hungary (now Czech Republic) in 1843, and invented the process and associated machinery for cutting large block sugar into manageable uniform pieces. Rad is credited with the invention of sugar cubes.

Professional life

Invention of the sugar-cutting process

The idea to produce sugar in cube form came from his wife, who cut herself while paring down the standard large, commercial sugar loaf into smaller parts for use in the home. Rad had become involved with management of a sugar factory in 1840 in the South Bohemian town of Datschitz (present day Dačice). He began work on a machine for transforming sugar into cube form, leading to a five-year patent for the cube press he invented, granted on 23 January 1843.

Personal life
Rad was father of 16 children. He died in 1871 in Vienna.

References

Further reading
  Late 18th century Swedish sugar chest (display) referencing Rad's invention, at Deutsches Technikmuseum.
  , see also , accessed 7 July 2015.
  
  DZDF/Museum Dačice: Würfelzucker
  Archiv Reinhard Lämmel
  Würfelzucker
 https://archive.today/20070828175054/http://www.wissenschaftskalender.at/text/index.aspx?D=1310

1799 births
1871 deaths
Austrian businesspeople
Austrian inventors